Jutta Burggraf (1952 Hildesheim, Germany– 5 November 2010 Pamplona, Spain) was a German Catholic theologian. Burggraf taught at the University of Navarra, where she wrote books and did research. She was a numerary member of Opus Dei.

References 

1952 births
2010 deaths
20th-century German Catholic theologians
People from Hildesheim
Opus Dei members
German expatriates in Spain
Women Christian theologians